Choi Chi-sum  (born April 14, 1960) is an outspoken far right evangelical in Hong Kong.

Choi was baptized in 1978 and graduated from Hong Kong Baptist University in 1982.

Choi is the General Secretary of the Christian Conservative Society For Truth And Light and has been vice-chairperson of the China Holiness Church in Hong Kong  since 1998.

References

1960 births
Living people
Hong Kong evangelicals
Alumni of Hong Kong Baptist University